This is a list of foreign players in the Malaysia Hockey League, which commenced play in 2005. The following players must meet the following criteria of the rule by the Malaysia Hockey Federation. The player have played at least one League game. Players who were signed by Malaysia Hockey League clubs.

List of foreign players

Hong Kong 
 Akhbar Ali - RAMD HC - 2005
 Arif Ali - RAMD HC - 2005

India 
 Prem Kumar - Nur Insafi - 2007
 Deepak Kumar - Nur Insafi - 2007
 Bikash Toppo - Nur Insafi - 2007
 Pacha Sunil Prasad - Nur Insafi HC - 2005
 Dhanraj Pillay - Telekom Malaysia HC - 2005
 Len Aiyappa - Telekom Malaysia HC - 2005
 Abdullah Sukri -2013

Ireland 
  David Harte -UniKL - 2018

Singapore 
 Muhammad Anuar Ali - Maybank HC- 2005
 Faizal Ani - RMN Dolphins HC- 2005
 Mohd Faizal Mohd Idoris - RMN Dolphins HC- 2005
 Abdul Hadi Adam - RMN Dolphins HC- 2005

Pakistan 
 Syed Imran Ali Warsi - Bank Simpanan Nasional HC - 2003 & Nur Insafi HC - 2010 
 Ali Raza - Ernst & Young HC - 2005 
 Muhammad Sarwar  - Ernst & Young HC - 2005 
 Abdul Asim Khan  - S.A.S Pahang HC - 2005 
 Yasir Islam  - S.A.S Pahang HC - 2005  
 Sohail Abbas  - Bank Simpanan Nasional HC - 2005
 Furqan Saleem - KL Hockey Club -2013-2014

South Korea 
 Kang Keong-Wook - Sapura HC - 2005
 Hwang Jong-Hyun - Sapura HC - 2005

See also
 Malaysia Hockey League

References

Malaysia Hockey League

Malaysia Hockey League
Malaysia
Hockey